Dual specificity protein phosphatase 1 is an enzyme that in humans is encoded by the DUSP1 gene.

Function 

The expression of DUSP1 gene is induced in human skin fibroblasts by oxidative/heat stress and growth factors.  It specifies a protein with structural features similar to members of the non-receptor-type protein-tyrosine phosphatase family, and which has significant amino-acid sequence similarity to a Tyr/Ser-protein phosphatase encoded by the late gene H1 of vaccinia virus.  The bacterially expressed and purified DUSP1 protein has intrinsic phosphatase activity, and specifically inactivates mitogen-activated protein (MAP) kinase in vitro by the concomitant dephosphorylation of both its phosphothreonine and phosphotyrosine residues.  Furthermore, it suppresses the activation of MAP kinase by oncogenic ras in extracts of Xenopus oocytes.  Thus, DUSP1 may play an important role in the human cellular response to environmental stress as well as in the negative regulation of cellular proliferation.

Interactions 

DUSP1 has been shown to interact with MAPK14, MAPK1 and MAPK8.

References

Further reading 

 
 
 
 
 
 
 
 
 
 
 
 
 
 
 
 

EC 3.1.3